Delta High School is a four-year public high school in Clarksburg, California, United States. It is part of the River Delta Unified School District.  It is co-located in the same facility and shares a principal with Clarksburg Middle School.  The combined enrollment for both schools is approximately 460 as of 2022.

Academics
In 2009 Delta High was listed as a California Distinguished School.  It has a GreatSchools rating of 7 out of 10.

Athletics
Delta High School students participate in the California Interscholastic Federation Sac-Joaquin Section.  They participate in Division V competition. The Saints field teams in most sports for both boys and girls.

Notable alumni

 Charles Carroll "Tony" Eason, former football quarterback who played in the National Football League for the New England Patriots and New York Jets.
 Joanna "Cocktail" Hernandez, VH1's For the Love of Ray J winner

References

External links
 Official site
 Delta High School Report Card

High schools in Yolo County, California
Public high schools in California
Magnet schools in California